Balin is a railway station on the Taiwan Railways Administration (TRA) West Coast line located in Guantian District, Tainan, Taiwan.

History
The station was opened on 16 December 1901.

See also
 List of railway stations in Taiwan

References

1901 establishments in Taiwan
Railway stations in Tainan
Railway stations opened in 1901
Railway stations served by Taiwan Railways Administration